Stadio Moretti was a multi-use stadium in Udine, Italy. It was initially used as the stadium of Udinese Calcio matches.  It was replaced by Stadio Friuli in 1976.  The capacity of the stadium was 25,000 spectators.  It also hosted speedway events.

External links
 Stadium history

Defunct football venues in Italy
Moretti
Moretti
Defunct speedway venues in Italy
Defunct sports venues in Italy
Sports venues in Friuli-Venezia Giulia
Moretti
Sports venues completed in 1920
Sports venues demolished in 1998
Demolished buildings and structures in Italy
1920 establishments in Italy
1998 disestablishments in Italy